The 2001 Ugandan Super League was the 34th season of the official Ugandan football championship, the top-level football league of Uganda.

Overview
The 2001 Uganda Super League was contested by 15 teams and was won by SC Villa, while Military Police FC, Chicago FC, Horizon FC, Rock Star FC and Black Rhino were relegated.

League standings

Leading goalscorer
The top goalscorer in the 2001 season was Hassan Mubiru of Express FC with 27 goals.

Footnotes

External links
Uganda - List of Champions - RSSSF (Hans Schöggl)
Ugandan Football League Tables - League321.com

Ugandan Super League seasons
1
Uganda
Uganda